Chul-woo is a Korean masculine given name. People with this name include:
Lee Chul-woo (born 1939), South Korean politician, member of the Gyeongsangbuk-do Provincial Council
Lim Chul-woo (born 1954), South Korean writer
Lee Chul-woo (born 1955), South Korean politician, member of the National Assembly 
Park Chul-woo (born 1965), South Korean football player
Jang Chul-woo (born 1971), South Korean football player
Choi Chul-woo (born 1977), South Korean football player
Park Chul-woo (born 1985), South Korean volleyball player
Lee Chul-woo (born 1992), South Korean model and actor 
Son Chul-woo, North Korean cross-country skier, represented North Korea at the 1992 Winter Olympics